Stremlau is a German language habitational surname. Notable people with the name include:
 John Stremlau (born 1953), retired U.S. soccer player
 Joseph P. Stremlau (1892–1970), American farmer, businessman, and politician

References 

German-language surnames
German toponymic surnames